Glanidium cesarpintoi is a species of driftwood catfishes found in the Mogi-guassú River basin of São Paulo, Brazil in South America.

Etymology
The catfish is named in honor of colleague Cesar Pinto (1896-1964), a helminthologist, in gratitude for his assistance and his hospitality during Ihering’s studies in São Paulo, Brazil.

References

Soares-Porto, L.M., 1998. Monophyly and interrelationships of the Centromochlinae (Siluriformes: Auchenipteridae). p. 331-350. In L.R. Malabarba, R.E. Reis, R.P. Vari, Z.M.S. Lucena and C.A.S. Lucena (eds.) Phylogeny and classification of neotropical fishes. Porto Alegre: EDIPUCRS. 

Auchenipteridae
Catfish of South America
Taxa named by Rodolpho von Ihering
Fish described in 1928